Sala parish can refer to:
 Sala Parish, Babīte Municipality;
 Sala Parish, Sala Municipality.
 Sala Parish, Church of Sweden